Sergey Mikhailovich Spigelglas or Spiegelglass or Shpigelglas (29 April 1897 – 29 January 1941) was acting head of the Soviet foreign intelligence service, then part of the NKVD, from February to June 1938.

Spigelglas was born into the family of a Jewish bookkeeper in Mosty in present-day Hrodna Voblast, Belarus. After graduating from Warsaw Technical High School, he entered the law school at Moscow University. In 1917 he was drafted into the Russian Army and served as an ensign in the 42nd reserve regiment. Following the October Revolution, he joined the Cheka, and because of his facility with languages—he spoke French, Polish, German, and Russian—he became a member of the Foreign Department. In 1926, he was stationed in Mongolia, perhaps reporting to Yakov Blumkin, where he conducted active intelligence work against China and Japan.

In 1930, Spigelglas became the chief undercover agent of the OGPU, later the NKVD, in Paris. As a cover for his operations, he worked as the bourgeois proprietor of a fish store near the Boulevard Montmartre. Spigelglas's main task was spying on the White Russian and Trotskyist organizations in Paris, where he controlled the penetration agents Mark Zborowski and Roland Abbiate. He successfully recruited the double agent Nikolai Skoblin and his wife Nadezhda Plevitskaya.

Spigelglas returned to Moscow, where he trained new agents in counterintelligence and acted as deputy director of the Foreign Department reporting to Abram Slutsky. His particular forte was the liternoye (top secret) or liquidation operation. He engineered the assassination of the Ukrainian nationalist Yevhen Konovalets in Rotterdam in May 1938, the execution of the defector Ignace Reiss in Switzerland in September 1937, and the kidnapping of the leader of Russian All-Military Union (ROVS), General Evgenii Miller, in France in September 1937. It has also been suggested that he was the mastermind behind the murder-decapitation of the Trotskyist leader of the Fourth International, Rudolf Klement, in France in July 1938, and the murder of the defector Georges Agabekov in France in 1937. When Slutsky died in February 1938, poisoned by order of Nikolai Yezhov, Spigelglas became the acting director of foreign intelligence.

The head of the NKVD, Lavrenti Beria, had Spigelglas arrested seven months later on November 2, 1938. He was held in Lefortovo prison and attempted a hunger strike which failed once his jailers began a regimen of intravenous feeding. After "strong pressure," a euphemism for torture, he began to make a confession in May 1939, and a tribunal convicted him of treachery on November 28, 1940. (In his confession, Spigelglas claimed that Lev Sedov died of natural causes, not the victim of NKVD foul play.) He was executed on January 29, 1941.

Historical opinion on Spigelglas is divided. Some, following the lead of Alexander Orlov, portray him as a "careerist" ready to liquidate dozens of honest people to advance himself, a man who could disingenuously claim that the deaths of those he murdered were necessary in the Bolshevik's struggle against their enemies. Others, following Sudoplatov, believe he was polite, business-like, intelligent, and a patriot. The Russian government rehabilitated him in 1991.

Further reading 
John Costello and Oleg Tsarev, Deadly Illusions, Crown, 1993 
Walter Krivitsky, In Stalin's Secret Service, Enigma Books, 2000 
Alexander Orlov, The March of Time, St. Ermins Press, 2004. 
Pavel Sudoplatov, Special Tasks, Little, Brown and Company, 1994.

References 

1897 births
1941 deaths
People from Masty
People from Grodnensky Uyezd
Jews from the Russian Empire
Belarusian Jews
Soviet Jews
Jewish socialists
Cheka
NKVD officers
Russian military personnel of World War I
Jews executed by the Soviet Union
Great Purge victims from Belarus
Majors of State Security